Victor Slezak (born July 30, 1957) is an American stage, television and screen actor who has appeared in numerous films, including The Bridges of Madison County (1995), Beyond Rangoon (1995), The Devil's Own (1997), The Siege (1998),The Cat's Meow (2001), Timequest as John F. Kennedy (2002), and The Notorious Bettie Page (2005).

On Broadway, he starred as John F. Kennedy, opposite Margaret Colin, in Jackie: An American Life. He appeared Off-Broadway in 2007, playing the father of the character played by actress Olivia Wilde in Beauty on the Vine at the Harold Clurman Theatre.

Personal life
Victor Michael Slezak was born in Youngstown, Ohio. He is married to Leslie Rawlings; they have one child. Slezak is not related to Walter Slezak or Erika Slezak. His surname is of Czech or Polish origin (cz. Slezák, pl. Ślęzak, meaning Silesian).

Filmography

Television credits

See also 
 Slezak

References

External links

1957 births
American male film actors
American male stage actors
American male television actors
Living people
Male actors from Youngstown, Ohio
20th-century American male actors
21st-century American male actors